Giling Basah is a term used by Indonesian coffee processors to describe the method they use to remove the hulls of Coffea arabica.  Literally translated from Indonesian, the term means "wet grinding".  

The Arabica coffee industry also uses the term "wet hulled" to describe the same process.

Most small-scale farmers in Sumatra, Sulawesi, Flores and Papua use the Giling Basah process. The mature coffee fruit, referred to as the coffee cherry, is harvested. and farmers remove the outer skin mechanically using locally built pulping machines. The coffee beans, coated with mucilage, are stored for up to a day during which a natural fermentation breaks down the sticky residue. Afterwards the coffee beans, protected by a parchment hull (endocarp) are washed off  before being let out to dry.

Contrary to other traditional drying methods, where the parchment coffee is dried until it reaches about 12% moisture content, the beans in the Giling Basah process are hulled when they reach between 30 and 35% moisture content; still semi-wet. The green coffee beans are then further dried to reach the exportable 12% moisture content. This operation gives the beans a unique bluish-green appearance and is thought to reduce the acidity and increase the body, resulting in the classic Indonesian cup profile. The Giling Basah process also introduces additional flavours that can be vegetal or herbal, woody or musty, sometimes earthy.

The Giling Basah process can create a "goat's foot," a split on one end, in green coffee beans.  Sometimes the hulling machine partially crushes a soft bean, giving the bean a shape resembling a cloven hoof.

See also
 Coffee production in Indonesia

Notes

Agriculture in Indonesia
Coffee production
Coffee in Indonesia